The Katipunan ng Kamalayang Kayumanggi (KTPNAN), (lit. 'Society of Brown Consciousness') also known as Katipunan Party, is a federalist political party founded in the Philippines by Faisal Mangondato and Carlos Serapio in 2014.

History
For the 2022 elections, the party has nominated Faisal Mangondato for president and Carlos Serapio for vice president.

Organization and structure

Party leadership

Electoral performance

Presidential and vice presidential elections

Legislative elections

References 

Political parties in the Philippines
Political parties established in 2014
Federalist parties
Federalism in the Philippines
2014 establishments in the Philippines